Missa Mexicana is a studio album by international Early Music ensemble The Harp Consort. It was released in October 2002 under Harmonia Mundi, HMX 2907293. It juxtaposes a mass setting by Juan Gutiérrez de Padilla with Latin American and African folk dances that inspired it.

Track listing

References

External links
The Harp Consort

2002 classical albums